Nontapat Panchan (born November 23, 1981 in Bangkok) is a Thai foil fencer. Panchan had won nine medals - 5 Golds and 1 Silver in Individual Men's Foil, 2 Golds, 1 Silver, and 1 Bronze in the Men's Team Foil event  Southeast Asian Games 2001 in Kuala Lumpur, Malaysia, 2003 in Ho Chi Minh, Vietnam, 2005 in Manila, Philippines, 2007 in Bangkok, Thailand, 2011 in Palembang, Indonesia, and 2015 in Singapore. He is also a two-time NCAA champion (2002 and 2003). Nontapat graduated with an Economics Degree from Pennsylvania State University in State College, Pennsylvania, under a full scholarship grant.

Panchan represented Thailand at the 2008 Summer Olympics in Beijing, where he competed in the men's individual foil event. He lost the first preliminary round match to Poland's Sławomir Mocek, with a score of 7–15.

See also
List of Pennsylvania State University Olympians

References

External links
Profile – FIE
NBC 2008 Olympics profile

1981 births
Living people
Nontapat Panchan
Nontapat Panchan
Nontapat Panchan
Fencers at the 2008 Summer Olympics
Nontapat Panchan
Fencers at the 2002 Asian Games
Fencers at the 2006 Asian Games
Fencers at the 2010 Asian Games
Fencers at the 2014 Asian Games
Southeast Asian Games medalists in fencing
Nontapat Panchan
Nontapat Panchan
Competitors at the 2001 Southeast Asian Games
Competitors at the 2003 Southeast Asian Games
Competitors at the 2005 Southeast Asian Games
Competitors at the 2007 Southeast Asian Games
Competitors at the 2011 Southeast Asian Games
Competitors at the 2015 Southeast Asian Games
Nontapat Panchan
Nontapat Panchan